WJGO is a commercial radio station licensed to Tice, Florida, broadcasting to the Cape Coral-Fort Myers area on 102.9 FM. It airs an adult hits music format branded as "Bob FM".

History
WJGO first signed on the air in 1999 on 102.9 FM after radio station WSGL moved from 103.1 to 104.7. The station signed on with the Jones Radio Rhythmic Oldies format. Jones abandoned that format in 2001, and WJGO moved to a live Rhythmic Oldies format known as Groovin' Oldies 102.9 until March 16, 2007, when the station changed to its current format "Bob FM".

External links
Official Website

JGO
Adult hits radio stations in the United States
Bob FM stations
Radio stations established in 1999
Renda Broadcasting radio stations
1999 establishments in Florida